Mount Darwin North is a constituency represented in the National Assembly of the Parliament of Zimbabwe. Its current MP since the 2013 general election is Noveti Muponora of ZANU–PF.

Members

References 

Mashonaland Central Province
Parliamentary constituencies in Zimbabwe